Treska is a river in the western part of North Macedonia, a right tributary to Vardar.

It rises in the Stogovo mountain at an altitude of around 2000 meters, and flows eastwards through the valley of Kičevo. At Makedonski Brod it turns northwards, flows between the mountains of Suva Gora and Karadžica, finally flowing into the Vardar in the Skopje suburb Gjorče Petrov.

Three dams have been built on Treska:
 in 1937 the Matka dam and lake near Skopje
 in 2004 the Kozjak dam and lake
 in 2012 the Sveta Petka

References

Rivers of North Macedonia